Cairnbrook Historic District is a national historic district located at Shade Township in Somerset County, Pennsylvania. The district includes 132 contributing buildings and 8 contributing structures. It encompasses an area developed by the Loyalhanna Coal and Coke Company of Philadelphia, Pennsylvania between 1912 and 1920.  It includes the remaining extant mine resources and the archaeological remains of the mine.  They consist of workers' housing, a variety of commercial and social buildings, and a modern draft entry mine with accompanying extractive buildings and structures.  Notable buildings include the motor barn, supply house, electric substation, and Loyalhanna Coal and Coke Company Office (1914).  The mine operated until 1958.

It was listed on the National Register of Historic Places in 1994.

References

External links

Historic American Engineering Record in Pennsylvania
Historic districts in Somerset County, Pennsylvania
Historic districts on the National Register of Historic Places in Pennsylvania
National Register of Historic Places in Somerset County, Pennsylvania
1994 establishments in Pennsylvania